Paul Kahn may refer to:

Paul Kahn (rugby league), rugby league footballer who played in the 1970s
Paul W. Kahn (born 1952), professor of law at Yale Law School